Three Worlds is a 2012 French drama film directed by Catherine Corsini. The film competed in the Un Certain Regard section at the 2012 Cannes Film Festival.

Plot
An ambitious and gifted young man named Al is about to marry the daughter of his boss. This is supposed to make himself the new boss. He celebrates his future with his friends. But when he decides to drive a car in spite of the previous binge drinking he kills somebody. Fearing his prospects to fade away he lets his friends persuade him to commit hit and run.

Cast
 Raphaël Personnaz as Al
 Clotilde Hesme as Juliette
 Arta Dobroshi as Vera
 Reda Kateb as Franck
 Alban Aumard as Martin
 Adèle Haenel as Marion
 Jean-Pierre Malo as Testard
 Laurent Capelluto as Frédéric
 Rasha Bukvic as Adrian

References

External links
 

2012 films
2012 drama films
French drama films
2010s French-language films
Films directed by Catherine Corsini
2010s French films